Đi tìm ẩn số is the version of the Deal or No Deal television show on HTV 7 in Vietnam as a part of TFS's Tạp Chí Văn Nghệ. It premiered on June 19, 2005, hosted by Thanh Bạch.

The set of the show was originally similar to the Australian version with 20 cases and the top prize of 50,000,000 Vietnamese đồng (US$2,400). Later the format followed the US version, with 26 cases held by models. The prizes range from 1,000 đồng (5¢ US) to 100,000,000 đồng (US$4,800). Like the original Dutch version, there is a quiz round, but it is shorter. The quiz round is not played in celebrity editions.

The top prize was won by Vietnamese actor Lê Bình in October 2011. On July 15, 2012, non-celebrity contestant Minh Trang won the top prize as well.

The show took a break on June 15, 2008 due to death of Prime Minister Võ Văn Kiệt, later on May 17, 2009; June 24, 2012; June 30, 2013; August 3, 2014 and August 16, 2015 due to the extended time for the final Road to Mount Olympia, finally later on September 11, 2011; October 13, 2013 and December 4, 2016 due to death of Võ Chí Công, Võ Nguyên Giáp and Fidel Castro.

Gameplay

Round 1
5 questions, each with 4 possible answers, are given to 26 players. All players are given 5 seconds to answer each question using keypads. If a player answers correctly, they receive one point for each contestant who answered incorrectly. All players who choose a wrong answer receive nothing. The two highest scorers at the end of the round move on to the next round.

Round 2
The two remaining contestants face each other at a single showdown-style podium with two buzzers on it. They are given 5 seconds to decide whether or not to press the button. If a player buzzed, that player receives 3,000,000₫ (US$144) and the other one moves on to the final round. If no one buzzed, the host will ask a math question. The one who buzzes first and calculates correctly proceeds to the final round.

Final round
The final round is the briefcase-picking game of Deal or No Deal and the format followed the American version, except for a significant change: there are no final swaps or counter-offers. The value of each briefcase are as follows:

Những ẩn số vàng
The second version, Những ẩn số vàng (Hidden Golds) hosted by Chí Trung, was simultaneously aired on H1 from September 10, 2006 to 2008 after the success of the first version. The gameplay was the same as the first version. The differences were there were only 20 players in round 1, the prize of round 2 was only 1,500,000₫ (US$72), as well as the final round, which features 20 cases held by models and the prizes range from 1,000₫ to 50,000,000₫.

Winners 
There are 10 grand prize winners in the show's history, but some of them are missing.

References

External links
Official Site
List of television programmes broadcast by HTV

Deal or No Deal
Vietnamese television series
Ho Chi Minh City Television original programming
2000s Vietnamese television series
2010s Vietnamese television series 
2005 Vietnamese television series debuts